Nico Mantl (born 6 February 2000) is a German professional footballer who plays as a goalkeeper for Danish Superliga club AaB, on loan from Austrian Bundesliga side Red Bull Salzburg.

Career
After nearly two seasons as Unterhaching's first choice goalkeeper, Mantl completed a move to Austrian Bundesliga side Red Bull Salzburg in January 2021, signing a four-and-a-half year deal. At the end of December 2022, Mantl signed loan deal for the rest of the season with Danish Superliga club AaB.

Honours
 Austrian Champion: 2020–21, 2021-22
 Austrian Cup: 2021, 2022

References

External links
 Profile at FuPa.net
 
 

2000 births
Living people
German footballers
German expatriate footballers
Footballers from Munich
Association football goalkeepers
Germany under-21 international footballers
SpVgg Unterhaching players
FC Liefering players
FC Red Bull Salzburg players
AaB Fodbold players
3. Liga players
Austrian Football Bundesliga players
German expatriate sportspeople in Austria
German expatriate sportspeople in Denmark
Expatriate footballers in Austria
Expatriate men's footballers in Denmark